The Empire League is a high school athletic league that is part of the CIF Southern Section.  It serves large public schools in the Orange County, California area.

Members
Teams for the 2018–2019 season are:
 Crean Lutheran High School
 Cypress High School
 Kennedy High School
 Pacifica High School
 Tustin High School
 Valencia High School

References

CIF Southern Section leagues